Willie Henry (born March 20, 1994) is an American football defensive tackle for the Birmingham Stallions of the United States Football League (USFL). He played college football at Michigan.

Professional career

Baltimore Ravens
Henry was drafted by the Baltimore Ravens in the fourth round, 132nd overall, in the 2016 NFL Draft.
He was placed on injured reserve on November 15, 2016, ending his rookie season without playing a single snap through nine games, being inactive for all but one.

On September 24, 2017, Henry played his first regular season game for the Baltimore Ravens. He ended the 2017 season with 3.5 sacks and two fumble recoveries in 13 games.

After missing the first four games of the 2018 season due to hernia surgery, Henry played in three games before being placed on injured reserve on October 23, 2018.

On August 30, 2019, Henry was released by the Ravens.

San Francisco 49ers
On January 22, 2020, Henry signed a reserve/future contract with the San Francisco 49ers. He was waived with a non-football illness designation on July 28, 2020. He was re-signed to their practice squad on October 27, 2020. He was elevated to the active roster on November 28 for the team's week 12 game against the Los Angeles Rams, and reverted to the practice squad after the game. He was released on December 15, 2020.

Houston Texans
On December 22, 2020, Henry signed with the practice squad of the Houston Texans. His practice squad contract with the team expired after the season on January 11, 2021.

Philadelphia Eagles
On May 25, 2021, Henry signed with the Philadelphia Eagles. On July 25, 2021, Eagles released Henry.

New York Giants 
On August 12, 2021, Henry signed with the New York Giants. He was waived on August 31, 2021 and re-signed to the practice squad the next day. On September 28, 2021, Henry was released from the practice squad.

Birmingham Stallions
Henry signed with the Birmingham Stallions of the United States Football League on April 28, 2022.

References

External links
 Michigan Wolverines bio

1994 births
Living people
American football defensive tackles
Baltimore Ravens players
Birmingham Stallions (2022) players
Houston Texans players
Michigan Wolverines football players
New York Giants players
Philadelphia Eagles players
Players of American football from Cleveland
San Francisco 49ers players